Clive Thomas may refer to: 
 Clive Thomas (football) (born 1936), Welsh football referee
 Clive Eric Thomas (born 1971), Anglican Archdeacon
 Clive Y. Thomas (born 1938), Guyanese economics professor and political activist